"I Fall All Over Again" is a song by Canadian singer-songwriter Dan Hill, released as a single in 1991. It was the first single released from his tenth studio album, Dance of Love. The song reached No. 7 on the U.S. Billboard Adult Contemporary chart in early 1992. It was Hill's last of seven top 10 U.S. AC chart hits.

Charts

Weekly charts

Year-end charts

References

1991 songs
1991 singles
Dan Hill songs
Songs written by Dan Hill
Quality Records singles